John Romer may refer to:

John Lambertus Romer (1680–1754), British military engineer
John Romer (Egyptologist) (born 1941), British historian
John Romer (politician), 19th century Governor of Bombay